Baksa Badal is a 1970 Bengali film directed by Nityananda Datta. The film was released by D. M. Productions, with music composed by Satyajit Ray. The film starred Soumitra Chatterjee, Aparna Sen, Prasad Mukhopadhyay, Satindra Bhattacharya, Subrato Sen, and Sabitri Chatterjee in lead roles.

Cast
 Soumitra Chatterjee
 Aparna Sen
 Prasad Mukhopadhyay
 Satindra Bhattacharya
 Subrato Sen
 Sabitri Chatterjee

References

External links
 
 Baksa Badal in Gomolo

Bengali-language Indian films
1970 films
1970s Bengali-language films
Films based on works by Bibhutibhushan Bandyopadhyay